Jessika Guehaseim (born 23 August 1989) is a former  French hammer thrower, a journalist and a Rugby League player.

Biography
Guehaseim won the gold medal at the 2013 Mediterranean Games.

Achievements

Personal Bests

See also
 France at the 2013 Mediterranean Games

References

External links
 

1989 births
Living people
Sportspeople from Montpellier
French sportspeople of Ivorian descent
French female hammer throwers
Mediterranean Games gold medalists for France
Athletes (track and field) at the 2013 Mediterranean Games
Mediterranean Games medalists in athletics